Amarasiri Kalansuriya, (born 20 September 1940), popularly known as Kalan, is an actor in Sri Lankan cinema, theatre and television. Kalansuriya made his first film appearance alongside Vijaya Kumaratunga in  Hanthana Kathawa. His next film Ahas Gauwa won him a best actor award in 1974. He was born in Kandy, and is an alumnus of Dharmaraja College.

Personal life and early life 
Kalansuriya was born on 20 September 1940 in a village called Meepawala, Sri Lanka as the second child of the family. His father Kalansuriya Francis Appuhami was a farmer. His mother Bengamuwa Arachchige Podi Hamine was a housewife. Kalansuriya started his school career with Kiribathkumbura Sri Swarnajothi School and then attended Dharmaraja College in Kandy. When studying at Dharmaraja, he was a talented athlete who set the school record for 800m in athletics. He finished second in intercollegiate sports as well as got school colors for boxing.

He has one elder brother, Nissanka and two younger brothers: Padmasena and Ariyapala. His mother died due to a fish bone blocking her throat. After a while, his father married a second time to Karunawathie. She took good care of Kalan and his brothers like her own children. After she had three children, Kalan and older brother thought to live alone. Later they were kicked out in public for not paying house rent. Then the brothers lived by making a discarded cart as a temporary home. Once stones were quarried on the Maiyangana side and Kalan was worked as rice wrapper at the Leon Cafe restaurant in Kandy.

He worked in the Agricultural Department in Mahiyanganaya as a minor worker. At the age of 18, he served as a soldier in the Second Volunteer Lions Regiment for six years. In 1966 he worked at Mallika Studio in Kandy. He started a business in Kandy in 1970, a sale of old bells. Profiting from this, he started a small sewing company called 'My In' in Kandy. Successful he moved up into tailoring and owned two tailor shops. Here he got the chance to make clothes for the army and rub shoulders with rising political figures like Lalith Athulathmudali.

He is married to Ajantha Thalatha Kumari Ekanayake, while doing his "My In" clothing store. She was educated at Gampola Convent and Pushpadana College, Peradeniya. They married on 18 December 1972, and the couple has a son and two daughters. Eldest son Duminda is a businessman and married to Janaki Wijesekara. Two daughters are Madhumathi Kumari who is married to Dr. Dhammika Sedara. The youngest daughter, Vindhya, is employed by Sri Lankan Airlines.

Acting career
Kalansuriya was chosen as the lead actor for an 8mm film Reyath Dawalath directed by a young man who was a member of the Photographic Society, a student of Kingswood College. Anoma Wattaladeniya played the lead role in this film who later married director Ranjith Perera. She was also a TV presenter. Then on Dharmasena Pathiraja's recommendation, he got the opportunity to act as a university student in the romantic film Hanthane Kathawa directed by Sugathapala Senarath Yapa. He also acted in various roles in Pathiraja's' Ahas Gawwa, Lester James Peiris' Akkara Paha and Ranjith Lal's Nimwalalla as a talented actor.

Kalansuriya accepted an invitation from H. D. Premaratne to star in the film Apeksha in 1978. His second film after the hiatus, Parithyagaya, won him more awards from OCIC and Sarasaviya. He won Best Supporting Actor for Puja in Presidential Award in 1986. Some of the other notable films include: Tharangā, Bambaru Avith, Apēkṣhā, Anūpamā, Poḍi Mallī, Kānchanā, Parityāgaya, Sinhabāhu, Vajirā, Sakvithi Suvaya, Yasa Isuru, Doringē Sayanaya, Poojā, Poḍi Wijē, Ahas Māḷigā and Sāgarayak Mæda. He won the Critics' Award for his performance in Ahas Gawwa in 1974. He won the Sarasaviya Award for Best Supporting Actor in 1982 and Sarasaviya and Presidential Awards for Best Supporting Actor in 1986 for the film Pooja.

Kalanasuriya had a leading role in the first television serial made in Sri Lanka, Dimuthu Muthu directed by D. B. Nihalsinghe. As a theatre actor, he produced and acted in the play Podi Vijay. After another hiatus, Kalansuriya returned to film with Shilpa Denumena in 2001 directed by Rodney Widanapathirana

Sujith Lakmal Weerasekera had written an autobiography in 2015 titled Duka Dinū Diviyaka Amaraṇīya Sæmarum Kalan ('Immortal Celebrations of a Life of Sorrow').

Filmography

References

External links
Amarasiri Kalansuriya's Biography in Sinhala Cinema Database
පීඩිත පන්තියේ තරුණයා සිනමාවෙන් මැවූ නළුවා
78 යි තාම තරුණයි - කලං
Rodney reaches a ‘Ridi Tharaka’

Sri Lankan male film actors
Alumni of Dharmaraja College
Sinhalese male actors
Actors from Kandy
Living people
20th-century Sri Lankan male actors
21st-century Sri Lankan male actors
1940 births